The Little Bog River is a short stream in Hancock County, Maine. Mill Brook flows west to Webb Pond. Via Mill Brook, Webb Pond, and Webb Brook, the Little Bog River is part of the Union River watershed.

See also
List of rivers of Maine

References

Maine Streamflow Data from the USGS
Maine Watershed Data From Environmental Protection Agency

Rivers of Hancock County, Maine
Rivers of Maine